Raw Data Feel is the sixth studio album by British band Everything Everything, released on 20 May 2022 through Infinity Industries, the band's own imprint. The album was produced by the band's guitarist Alex Robertshaw and Tom A.D. Fuller, and its release was preceded by the singles "Bad Friday" (7 February), "Teletype" (9 March), "I Want a Love Like This" (28 March) and "Pizza Boy" (4 May). On 27 May 2022, The album reached #4 in the UK Album Charts, their highest-charting release to date.

Themes
The songs on Raw Data Feel deal with the theme of trauma and relying on technology to cope with it. Feeling constrained by his reputation as a "political singer", frontman and lead songwriter Jonathan Higgs envisioned a more inward, less sociopolitical approach by using characters to play the experience out. 

With assistance from Mark Hanslip, a musician and researcher at the University of York's Contemporary Music Research Centre, Higgs developed an AI bot dubbed "Kevin", named after a recurring character in the album, to compose song lyrics generatively. Higgs fed it four different sources of information—LinkedIn's terms and conditions, the epic poem Beowulf, 400,000 posts from the message board 4chan, and the sayings of Confucius—before compiling and tweaking the results into useable material. Ultimately, the bot contributed roughly 5% of the album's lyrics and a song title, receiving a songwriting credit in the process, and has also provided the imagery for the album's artwork and promotional campaign. 

The band described the album's sound as "vivid, bright and spontaneous" and their "most natural and impulsive work".

Track listing

Charts

References 

2022 albums
Everything Everything albums
Concept albums
Artificial intelligence art